Eric Minkin (אריק מנקין; born November 28, 1950) is an American-Israeli former basketball player. He played the center position. He played in the Israeli Basketball Premier League, and for the Israeli national basketball team.

Biography

Minkin is 6' 7" (201 cm) tall, and is Jewish.

He attended Germantown Academy ('68), where in basketball Minkin was a three-time Philadelphia High School Inter-Academic League First-Teamer, from 1966-68. Minkin scored 1,358 career points for the school—at the time, the school record.

Minkin played basketball for Team USA in the 1969 Maccabiah Games in Israel. Others playing on the team included Andrew Hill, Steve Kaplan, and Neal Walk.

He attended Davidson College (BA, Political Science and Government, '72), and played for the Davidson Wildcats from 1969 to 1972. In 1970-71 and 1971-72 Minkin was Second Team All-Southern Conference. He graduated as a First Team Jewish All-American.

Minkin played in the Israeli Basketball Premier League for Maccabi Tel Aviv and Hapoel Galil Elyon. He was part of the Maccabi Tel Aviv Israeli team that in the 1976–77 FIBA European Champions Cup (EuroLeague) semifinals defeated CSKA Moscow — the Red Army team—in a dramatic upset. He recalled: “I drove myself to play better than everybody else. I was the smallest, whitest center in Europe. What choice did I have?”

He also played for the Israeli national basketball team in the 1979 FIBA European Championship for Men.

Minkin lives in Sarasota, Florida, and worked for 22 years as a registered nurse in Sarasota Memorial Hospital’s cardiac acute unit.

References 

1950 births
Living people
21st-century American Jews
American men's basketball players
Basketball players from Pennsylvania
Centers (basketball)
Competitors at the 1969 Maccabiah Games
Davidson Wildcats men's basketball players
Germantown Academy alumni
Hapoel Galil Elyon players
Israeli men's basketball players
Israeli people of American-Jewish descent
Jewish American sportspeople
Jewish Israeli sportspeople
Jewish men's basketball players
Maccabiah Games basketball players of the United States
Maccabi Tel Aviv B.C. players
Sportspeople from Sarasota, Florida